Chasity Melvin (born May 3, 1976) is a retired American professional basketball player, originally from Roseboro, North Carolina.

A 6'3" (1.90 m) forward, Melvin entered the WNBA in 1999, and played for the Cleveland Rockers, the Washington Mystics, and the Chicago Sky over twelve seasons in the league. She recorded WNBA career averages of 9.7 points per game and 5.4 rebounds per game. Melvin has also played professionally in Italy, Israel, Spain, Poland, Russia the ABL, and China.

During a game at the UIC Pavilion on August 15, 2007, Melvin's left eye was dislodged from its socket after Shameka Christon of the New York Liberty accidentally struck Melvin's face as the two were battling for a rebound. Melvin was treated at the University of Illinois-Chicago Medical Center, where her eye returned into its socket by itself. She was able to return to the arena to participate in Fan Appreciation Night activities after the game. Melvin suffered scratches to her cornea, but no skull fractures or vision loss.

Melvin played for Asia Aluminum Basketball Club in China during the 2008–09 WNBA off-season. She returned to the Mystics for the 2009 season; she had played there previously from 2004 to 2007.

Melvin attended and played basketball for North Carolina State University from 1994 to 1998.  In 1996–7, she was named a Kodak All-American.  She led the Wolfpack to a Final Four appearance in her senior season and set an NCAA semifinal record by scoring 37 points in the Wolfpack's loss to Louisiana Tech on March 27, 1998.
Melvin joined the WUBA Southern Lady Generals in 2014.
In 2019, Melvin went to Albania and Kosovo as a Sports Envoy for the U.S. State Department's Sport Diplomacy Office.

NC State statistics

Source

References

External links
 Chas44, Melvin's blog

1976 births
Living people
All-American college women's basketball players
American expatriate basketball people in China
American expatriate basketball people in Spain
American women's basketball players
Basketball players from North Carolina
Botaş SK players
Centers (basketball)
Chicago Sky players
Cleveland Rockers players
Guangdong Vermilion Birds players
Heilongjiang Dragons players
NC State Wolfpack women's basketball players
People from Roseboro, North Carolina
Philadelphia Rage players
Power forwards (basketball)
Washington Mystics players
Women's National Basketball Association All-Stars